The Youth League, also known as Hero Youth League for sponsorship reasons, is a system of youth football leagues that are managed, organised and controlled by the All India Football Federation. It consists of 3 age groups competitions: U17 (Elite Youth League), U15 (Junior League) and U13 (Sub-Junior League).

History

The league was founded as the I-League U19 in 2008 which was to give youth teams of the I-League a national league to play in as at that time the I-League youth teams only played in state youth leagues. Clubs fielded Under-19 teams. 16 teams were split into four groups of four with only one group containing only three teams. At the end of the season the top team from the group stage would move onto the final group stage with the other group winners and play each other once. The inaugural winners were Tata Football Academy.

The competition name was changed in 2012 to the I-League U-20, because many U-20 players in the I-League were not getting any time in the senior teams. Teams will play those within their own group twice and again the top teams will move on to the final group at the end.

The U20 title however only lasted for two seasons before the All India Football Federation decided to switch the tournament back to an under-19 tournament from 2014 onwards. From 2014, the format was changed where the tournament was divided into five region based zones, namely Kolkata, Mumbai, Shillong, Goa and Rest of India.

The competition once again changed in 2015–16 now played as U18 tournament. From 2017–18 season, the league was renamed as Youth League U18 and subsequently renamed to Elite League from 2018–19. Latest format change came with the introduction of Reliance Foundation Development League.

Under-17 level
 

The Elite Youth League or the Hero U-17 Youth Cup was previously known as I-League U18, I-League U19 and I-League U20. is the top level of youth football in India. It is contested between the under-17 sides of The I-League teams, Indian Super League teams, as well as other youth teams. The most successful team currently is AIFF Elite Academy, who won three titles. Minerva Punjab are the last known champions.
On 7 December 2018 AIFF decided to change its name to Hero Elite League.

Teams

The participants for the 2022–23 season are:

Structure
For younger categories, in most cases teams play each other in their respective zonal groups twice – home and away. At the end of the group stage, the top two teams go through to the final phase.

Those teams are divided into three groups and the group champions, along with the best second placed teams qualify for the knockout stages.

For Elite League, the latest tournament took place across ten venues, with single round-robin format in the group and knockout stage. The 49 teams from 29 states and union territories are divided in ten groups. Ten group winners and six best runners-up qualify for the knockout stage.

Past winners

List of winners

Under-15 level

Junior League

Under-13 level

Sub-Junior League

See also
 Junior National Football Championship
 Football in India
 Indian football league system
 Reliance Foundation Development League

References

External links
 
 Hero Elite League

 
2011 establishments in India
Sports leagues established in 2011
Youth football leagues
Youth football in India
Football leagues in India
Sports leagues in India
Professional sports leagues in India